Lathrostigma limbatofasciata is a species of ulidiid or picture-winged fly in the genus Lathrostigma of the family Tephritidae.

References

Ulidiidae